The grey-headed bullfinch (Pyrrhula erythaca) is a species of finch in the family Fringillidae. It is sometimes known as Beavan's bullfinch.

It is found in Bhutan, China, India, Myanmar, and Nepal. Its natural habitats are boreal forest and temperate forest.

Taxonomy

Molecular phylogeny indicates that species of the genus Pyrrhula have a common ancestor with the pine grosbeak (Pinicola enucleator).

References

grey-headed bullfinch
Birds of Bhutan
Birds of China
Birds of Nepal
Birds of Yunnan
grey-headed bullfinch
grey-headed bullfinch
Taxonomy articles created by Polbot